Acentrophryne is a genus of leftvents known from the eastern Pacific Ocean.  Fossils of the type species, A. longidens, have been found in Late Miocene strata of Rosedale, California.

Species
There are currently two recognized species in this genus:
 Acentrophryne dolichonema Pietsch & Shimazaki, 2005
 Acentrophryne longidens Regan, 1926

References

Linophrynidae
Marine fish genera
Taxa named by Charles Tate Regan